{|class="infobox" border=1 align="right" cellpadding=4 cellspacing=0 width=240 style="margin: 0 0 1em 1em; background: #f9f9f9; border: 1px #aaaaaa solid; border-collapse: collapse; font-size: 95%;"
|+ style="font-size: larger;"|Takefuji Bamboo 
|- 
|align="center" colspan=2|

|-
|Club Name|| 武富士バンブー
|-
|Arena|| Sugito, Saitama, Japan
|-
|Manager||  Yukio Nagata
|-
|Head coach||  Akihisa Ishihara
|-
|League||V.Premier League
|-
|Position 2008-09||V.Premier League 8th place    
|-
|Team Colors||Green      
|-
|Website||gogo-bamboo.tv
|-
|class="toccolours" style="padding: 0; background: #ffffff; text-align: center;" colspan="2"|

|}Takefuji Bamboo' (武富士バンブー, Takefuji Banbū) was a women's volleyball team based in Sugito, Saitama, Japan that was active between 2001 and 2009. It played in V.Premier League. The team logo is based on Kaguya-hime, principal character in Japanese mythology The Tale of the Bamboo Cutter. The owner of the team is Takefuji.

On 13 February 2009, Takefuji announced that it will stop the activities of Takefuji Bamboo in May 2009.

Honours
Japan Volleyball League/V.League/V.Premier League
Runners-up (1): 2002-2003

League results

 Squad 
 1    Chie Yoshizawa
 2    Misato Kaneko
 3    Ayako Sawahata
 4    Keiko Hara
 5    Rumi Adachi
 6    Ayaka Ikeura
 7    Kanako Naitoh　(Captain'')
 8    Yuki Ishikawa
 10  Naomi Imamura
 11  Masae Hirai
 12  Ayuka Hattori
 13  Tomomi Tamukai
 14  Yuka Misawa
 18  Haruka Sunada
 22  Mizuho Ishida
 23  Ayano Yamanaka

Japanese volleyball teams
Volleyball clubs established in 2001
2001 establishments in Japan
Sports teams in Saitama Prefecture